Type II cytokine receptors, also commonly known as class II cytokine receptors, are transmembrane proteins that are expressed on the surface of certain cells. They bind and respond to a select group of cytokines including interferon type I, interferon type II, interferon type III. and members of the interleukin-10 family  These receptors are characterized by the lack of a WSXWS motif which differentiates them from type I cytokine receptors.

Structure 
Typically type II cytokine receptors are heterodimers or multimers with a high and a low affinity component. These receptors are related predominantly by sequence similarities in their extracellular portions that are composed of tandem Ig-like domains. The structures for the extracellular domains of the receptors for interferon types, I, II, and III are all known.

Type II cytokine receptors are tyrosine-kinase-linked receptors. The intracellular domain of type II cytokine receptors is typically associated with a tyrosine kinase belonging to the Janus kinase (JAK family). Binding of the receptor typically leads to activation of the canonical JAK/STAT signaling pathway.

Types
Type II cytokine receptors include those that bind interferons and those that bind members of the interleukin-10 family (interleukin-10, interleukin-20, interleukin-22, and interleukin-28). Expression of specific receptor varieties is highly variable across tissue types with some receptors being ubiquitously expressed and some receptors only expressed in specific tissues.

Interferon receptors
The interferon receptor is a molecule displayed on the surface of cells which interacts with extracellular interferons. Class II cytokine receptors bind type I, type II, and type III interferons. Type I interferons play important roles in both the adaptive and innate immune responses, prevent proliferation of pathogens, and have antiviral activities. Type II interferons help to modulate the immune system’s response to pathogens, and these interferons also respond to pathogens. Type III interferons induce a similar response to type I interferons, but their expression is limited to epithelial cells. The receptor is coded for by number of different genes, due to the diversity of types of interferons. Regulation of cell surface receptor levels plays an important role in the regulation and limiting of interferon signaling.
 interferon-alpha/beta receptor
 interferon-gamma receptor
 Interferon type III receptor

Interleukin receptors

References 

2